Nikiski is a census-designated place (CDP) in Kenai Peninsula Borough, Alaska, United States. The population was 4,456 at the 2020 census, down from 4,493 in 2010.

Geography
Nikiski is located at  (60.707891, -151.262646) on the west side of the Kenai Peninsula. It lies along the shore of Cook Inlet between Salamatof to the south and the Swanson River to the northeast. It is bordered across the Swanson River by the Point Possession CDP.

The CDP is in a low-lying region covered by several lakes, including Stormy Lake, Suneva Lake, Daniels Lake, Timberlost Lake, Island Lake, Foreland Lake, Bernice Lake, and Cabin Lake.

The main road access is via the Kenai Spur Highway, which leads south  to the city of Kenai and north to Captain Cook State Recreation Area. A second road, the Nikiski Emergency Escape Route, also leads south to the City of Kenai.

Demographics

Nikiski first appeared on the 1880 U.S. Census as the unincorporated Tinneh villages of "Kultuk" (AKA Nikishka No. 3) and "Titukilsk and Nikishka". Kultuk had a population of 17, and Titukilsk and Nikishka had a population of 57, all of whom were Tinneh Natives. There apparently were no census reports from 1880 until 1980, when the area was organized as "Nikishka" and made a census-designated place (CDP). The name was altered to "Nikiski" in 1990 and has reported as such on each successive census.

As of the census of 2000, there were 4,327 people, 1,514 households, and 1,130 families residing in the CDP. There were 1,766 housing units at an average density of 25.4/sq mi (9.8/km2). The racial makeup of the CDP was 87.2% White, 0.1% Black or African American, 7.6% Native American, 0.7% Asian, 0.5% Pacific Islander, 0.8% from other races, and 3.1% from two or more races.  1.3% of the population were Hispanic or Latino of any race.

There were 1,514 households, out of which 41.7% had children under the age of 18 living with them, 60.9% were married couples living together, 7.9% had a female householder with no husband present, and 25.3% were non-families. 20.8% of all households were made up of individuals, and 3.8% had someone living alone who was 65 years of age or older.  The average household size was 2.86 and the average family size was 3.31.

In the CDP, the population was spread out, with 33.5% under the age of 18, 6.3% from 18 to 24, 29.8% from 25 to 44, 24.5% from 45 to 64, and 5.9% who were 65 years of age or older.  The median age was 34 years. For every 100 females, there were 109.0 males.  For every 100 females age 18 and over, there were 111.3 males.

The median income for a household in the CDP was $51,176, and the median income for a family was $55,969. Males had a median income of $50,673 versus $26,779 for females. The per capita income for the CDP was $20,128.  About 9.3% of families and 11.4% of the population were below the poverty line, including 13.0% of those under age 18 and 7.5% of those age 65 or over.

History
 
Nikiski was once home to an Agrium fertilizer plant, which was once the Kenai Peninsula Borough's largest employer. The facility closed in 2008 due to natural gas shortages, but the company continues to explore reopening it.

Notable people
 Mike Chenault, longest-serving speaker of the Alaska House of Representatives
 Mike Navarre, politician
 Norman Olson, owner of two private militias

See also

Nikiski High School

References

External links
 
 Northroader.com

Census-designated places in Alaska
Census-designated places in Kenai Peninsula Borough, Alaska
Populated coastal places in Alaska on the Pacific Ocean